Hernen Castle is a Dutch castle from the 14th century.

Hernen Castle is located in the south of Gelderland, in the village of Hernen (municipality of Wijchen), in the far west of the Rijk van Nijmegen. It probably originated around 1350, and then consisted of only one residential tower (keep). Later it was repeatedly expanded, with the former courtyard increasingly being filled. The residential tower collapsed in the 18th century.

The castle has not been inhabited since the 17th century and has never been besieged. Partly because of that, little has been cultivated, and it has been well preserved. It is the only castle in the Netherlands with covered weather corridors.

In 1883 it was bought by the Den Tex family. A daughter donated the castle in April 1940 to the Friends of the Geldersche Kasteelen Foundation, which was set up especially for this purpose. A part of the castle is accessible; in another part is occupied by the A.A. Bredius Foundation.

In 1968, the television series Floris was recorded at this castle.

Motte

September 2009, archaeologist Laurens Flokstra and historian Wim Kattenberg, both from Wijchen, came across the remains of a Motte-and-bailey castle, west of the river De Elst. On an old aerial photo from the Royal Air Force, Flokstra had discovered a circular structure in the landscape, after which they made a 'radargram' of the intended terrain with a bottom radar. This showed that a damped moth moat had to be present in the soil. In the subsequent excavations, shards from the 12th and 13th centuries were found on the site of the former canal. Further discoveries, in the center of the former castle, show that the motte must have been here at the beginning of the twelfth century.

References

External links 
 Kasteel Hernen, mooigelderland.nl

Historic house museums in the Netherlands
Castles in Gelderland
Museums in Gelderland